Leandro Damião da Silva dos Santos (born 22 July 1989), known as Leandro Damião or simply Damião, is a Brazilian professional footballer who plays as a striker for Japanese club Kawasaki Frontale. He has been capped at international level by Brazil.

Club career

Early career
Damião began his career as a midfielder, playing for local teams in Jardim Alegre, Paraná. Having failed a trial as a midfielder at Atlético Ibirama, he had a new opportunity as a striker and was signed by team.

Back to Atlético Ibirama, he scored eight goals in the 2009 Campeonato Catarinense and was transferred to Internacional, initially for the under-20 team.

Internacional
At Internacional, he won three titles with the club's under-20 side and earned a call-up to the B team. He scored twice in his Campeonato Gaúcho debut and was then called up to the first team for their 2010 Copa Libertadores campaign. Damião won his first major title in August 2010 when he helped Internacional defeat Guadalajara in the Copa Libertadores Finals. He scored the club's second goal in their second leg victory in Porto Alegre to win the competition 5–3 on aggregate. His performances at the Porto Alegre club earned him a place in the Brazil national football team and praise from Ronaldo, also drawing the interest of European clubs.

During the 2013 summer, he had offers from English side Tottenham Hotspur and Italian club Napoli. He was close to join the Italian side, but the deal fell through because "sponsorship contracts made it impossible". Even though the club bought Gonzalo Higuaín after failing to land the Brazilian striker, Napoli chairman Aurelio De Laurentiis later stated that Rafa Benítez wanted Damião instead of Higuaín.

Santos
After a season below standards with Internacional (only 13 goals in nearly 50 matches), Damião signed a five-year deal with fellow top-divisioner Santos FC in December, who paid a R$ 41 million fee, supported by investors, to bring Damião to Vila Belmiro. He was presented on 9 January of the following year. It was the highest fee ever paid by a Brazilian club to sign a national player, only behind the R$60.5 million that brought Carlos Tevez to Corinthians.

Damião made his Santos debut on 6 February 2014, starting in a 2–1 away win over Linense, scoring a goal which was later disallowed due to offside. He scored his first goal for Peixe on the 20th, netting his side's first of a 2–1 away success over Atlético Sorocaba; eight days later he netted his second, the last of a 5–0 home thrashing of Bragantino.

Despite scoring five goals in 13 appearances as Santos came second in the league, Damião was hugely criticised due to his lack of agility and pace, plus his inability to score on a regular basis. He only scored more than one goal with a Santos shirt on 30 November, netting both goals in a 2–0 home win against Botafogo.

Cruzeiro (loan)
On 29 December 2014, after lengthy negotiations, Damião was loaned to league champions Cruzeiro, in a season-long deal, after a largely disappointing year at Santos. He was the top goalscorer of 2015 Campeonato Mineiro with nine goals, but had a disappointing 2015 Campeonato Brasileiro Série A with only four goals scored.

Battle in court
In 2015, Damião took legal action against Santos to terminate his contract after failing to receive payment for his image rights for three months and was granted the release of his contract in December 2015. The decision was overturned the following month, with the fee of 200 million (reais for any national transfer and euros for any international) being activated if he were to sign for another club.

On 7 January 2016, Damião was again declared a free agent, but on 26 January, after being on the verge of signing for Spanish club Real Betis for a fee of R$65 million.

An agreement was reached between Damião and Santos on 30 January 2016, as the player was attempting to sign with Real Betis. On 1 February 2016, the Spanish club pulled out of the deal that would bring him on an 18-month loan, leaving the player as a free agent.

Betis
On 4 February 2016, after a turnover in the club's board which involved the president's resignation, Damião signed a six-month deal with Betis with a buyout clause set on €12 million. He made his La Liga debut 23 days later, replacing Jorge Molina after 56 minutes of an eventual 2–2 draw against Rayo Vallecano at the Estadio Benito Villamarín.

Flamengo (loan)
On 14 July 2016 Flamengo signed Damião from Santos on a one-year loan deal.

Internacional (loan)
After his loan with Flamengo ended, Damião returned on loan to Internacional, who were at the time out of promotion spots in the 2017 Campeonato Brasileiro Série B. He scored 8 times in the competition and helped Internacional to return to the first division after finishing in second place. He stayed with Internacional in 2018, helping the team finish third in the 2018 Campeonato Brasileiro Série A and scoring 10 goals in the competition, just one less than teammate Nico López. Damião scored a total of 19 goals in his second spell at Internacional, reaching a total of 109 goals scored for the club and becoming the team's 10th best all-time top scorer.

On 11 December 2018, Internacional announced that Damião would not remain at the club after the player received an "irrefusable" offer from a Japanese club.

Kawasaki Frontale
On 14 December 2018, Kawasaki Frontale announced the signing of Leandro Damião in a one-year contract for the 2019 season. On 10 March 2019 Damião scored his first goal for the club against Yokohama F. Marinos, also achieving a brace. He scored 13 goals in the 2020 J.League campaign and helped the Frontale to win the J.League title. On 1 January 2021, he assisted Kaoru Mitoma's match winning goal in a 1–0 victory over Gamba Osaka in the final of the 2020 Emperor's Cup. On 8 July, he scored a hat-trick in an AFC Champions League match against Daegu FC. He became the J.League's joint top scorer in the 2021 J.League campaign with 23 goals, winning the J.League MVP Award.

International career
Damião was given his first call-up to the Brazil national team in March 2011 for the friendly against Scotland after Alexandre Pato withdrew from the squad due to injury. "I'm taking advantage of the circumstances to summon a player who has been playing well with Internacional and is young enough to play in the Olympics," said head coach Mano Menezes. He won his first cap in the match at the Emirates Stadium in London, which Brazil won 2–0.

Damião scored his first goal for Brazil in a 1–0 friendly win against Ghana on 5 September at Craven Cottage. He also represented Brazil at the 2012 Olympic football tournament in London, being the tournament's top scorer with six goals in five appearances as Brazil finished runners-up to Mexico.

Career statistics

Club

International

Scores and results list Brazil's goal tally first, score column indicates score after each Damião goal.

Honours
Internacional B
Copa FGF: 2009

Internacional
Copa Libertadores: 2010
Campeonato Gaúcho: 2011, 2012, 2013
Recopa Sudamericana: 2011

Flamengo
 Campeonato Carioca: 2017

Kawasaki Frontale
J1 League: 2020, 2021
Emperor's Cup: 2020
J.League Cup: 2019
Japanese Super Cup: 2019, 2021

Brazil U23
Olympic Games Silver Medal: 2012

Brazil
Superclásico de las Américas: 2011

Individual
Olympic Games top scorer: 2012
Campeonato Gaúcho top scorer: 2011, 2012
Campeonato Mineiro top scorer: 2015
J.League top scorer: 2021
J.League MVP Award: 2021
J.League Best XI: 2021
Footballer of the Year in Japan: 2021

References

External links
 Leandro Damião official website
 
 

1989 births
Living people
Sportspeople from Paraná (state)
Brazilian footballers
Brazilian expatriate footballers
Brazil international footballers
Association football forwards
Clube Atlético Hermann Aichinger players
Clube Náutico Marcílio Dias players
Clube Atlético Tubarão players
Sport Club Internacional players
Santos FC players
Cruzeiro Esporte Clube players
Campeonato Brasileiro Série A players
Campeonato Brasileiro Série C players
Real Betis players
Footballers at the 2012 Summer Olympics
Olympic footballers of Brazil
Olympic silver medalists for Brazil
Olympic medalists in football
Medalists at the 2012 Summer Olympics
Brazilian expatriate sportspeople in Spain
Expatriate footballers in Spain
Expatriate footballers in Japan
CR Flamengo footballers
Campeonato Brasileiro Série B players
La Liga players
J1 League players
J1 League Player of the Year winners
Kawasaki Frontale players